Norman Charles John Fleming (4 February 1903 – 12 September 1964) was an Australian rugby league footballer who played in the 1920s and 1930s.

Playing career
Fleming came to St. George via the local Brighton junior club in 1929. He was a five-eighth and halfback in his playing days and turned out for the Saints on 65 occasions., including 18 first grade games.

Norm Fleming later coached his famous son, Doug Fleming in the lower grades at St. George in the late 1940s. Norm Fleming also served in the RAAF in World War II.

Death
Fleming died on 12 September 1964 at Jannali, New South Wales.

References

St. George Dragons players
1903 births
1964 deaths
Australian Army personnel of World War II
Australian rugby league players
Rugby league players from Sydney
Rugby league halfbacks
Rugby league five-eighths
Australian Army soldiers